Walter Probst (17 April 1918 – February 2007) was an Austrian football player and manager.

He played for Rapid Wien, Wacker München, Austria Wien, Hakoah and Sportclub .

He coached IFK Göteborg, Austria Wien, Djurgårdens IF, Örgryte IS and Saab Linköping.

References

External links
Profile
Profile

1918 births
2007 deaths
Austrian footballers
SK Rapid Wien players
FK Austria Wien players
Austrian football managers
IFK Göteborg managers
FK Austria Wien managers
Djurgårdens IF Fotboll managers
Örgryte IS managers
Expatriate football managers in Sweden
Association football forwards